Roundabout homolog 2 is a protein that in humans is encoded by the ROBO2 gene.

References

Further reading